OGLE-TR-211 is a distant magnitude 14 star located about 5,700 light years away in the constellation of Carina.

Planetary system
OGLE-TR-211 has a transiting planet in a very close orbit, another hot Jupiter.

See also 
 OGLE-TR-182
 List of extrasolar planets

References

External links 
 

F-type stars
Planetary transit variables
Carina (constellation)
Planetary systems with one confirmed planet